Buick City was a name applied to the former Buick home plant following major renovations completed during the early 1980s to better compete with Japanese producers. The plant was a massive automobile manufacturing complex in the northeast of Flint, Michigan. Elements of the  complex dated from before 1904, when it was known as Flint Wagon Works. Once General Motors assumed operations all aspects of Buick vehicles were constructed, and it became known as "Buick City" in 1985. The engine block and cylinder heads were cast at Defiance Foundry in Defiance, Ohio and earlier at Saginaw Metal Casting Operations in Saginaw, Michigan.

Overview 
The original factory at one time was the largest in the world, consisting of 24 separate buildings contributing to the manufacturing process, until 1928 when the Ford River Rouge Complex was completed and began operations. In the beginning, all components were manufactured in one location, to include wheel bearings, nuts, bolts, and screws, to transmissions, suspension components, wheels and interior components. Operations were carried out in this fashion well into the 1940s and beyond.

The plant originated with Buick before the formation of General Motors. Other elements were built by early manufacturers and suppliers like Fisher Body. For more than 80 years, it was Buick's "home plant" and built the majority of models in the line up. After World War II, when vehicle production resumed, Buick City was the primary location where all components were created, with knock-down kits distributed to assembly plants in major metropolitan US cities, where the vehicles were locally assembled and distributed in their respective regions.

The Buick City concept represented a successful attempt by General Motors to experiment with just-in-time manufacturing methods in response to Japanese manufacturers. The experiment included successes: The 1989 Buick LeSabre built in Buick City was ranked the top car in the J.D. Power and Associates rankings for that year; it was the first American built car to appear on the list.

General Motors announced in 1997 that the plant would close, as production of the next generation of full sized GM cars would be consolidated at Orion Assembly. The plant closed on June 29, 1999. That same year, Buick City won J. D. Power's Platinum Award for assembly plant quality. The final cars built at Buick City were the Pontiac Bonneville and the Buick LeSabre. Manufacturing operations were transferred to Orion Assembly. 

The site was vacated by GM employees and site responsibilities were transferred to Motors Liquidation Company as of December 6, 2010. In 2013, American Cast Iron Pipe Company announced plans to construct a new 200,000 square foot manufacturing plant on the former Buick City complex.

As of 2016, it is the only General Motors plant to win the award. The closing of GM's manufacturing plants in Flint, and its subsequent economic toll on the community was chronicled in Michael Moore's 1989 documentary film, Roger & Me.

The plant's acreage became an EPA cleanup site.

In August 2018, a 156,000-square-foot Lear Corporation seat manufacturing facility opened, built on 33 acres of the former Buick City site in Flint.

In pop culture
The Old 97s 2001 album Satellite Rides features the track "Buick City Complex".

Further reading

References

External links
 Demolition photos
 JD Powers and Associates from Answers.com
 Flint 'Buick City' no more -- last Buicks made there roll off assembly line

Buick
General Motors factories
Former motor vehicle assembly plants
Motor vehicle assembly plants in Michigan
Economy of Flint, Michigan
Buildings and structures in Flint, Michigan
1904 establishments in Michigan
1999 disestablishments in Michigan
Demolished buildings and structures in Michigan